Butler Family Cemetery is a historic family cemetery located near Saluda, Saluda County, South Carolina. It is located behind the Butler Methodist Church. It was established about 1802, and includes the graves of members of one of South Carolina's leading families.  Notable burials include: William Butler (1759–1821), Pierce Mason Butler (1798–1847) and Andrew Pickens Butler (1796–1857).

It was added to the National Register of Historic Places in 1974.

References

External links
 

Cemeteries on the National Register of Historic Places in South Carolina
1802 establishments in South Carolina
Buildings and structures in Saluda County, South Carolina
National Register of Historic Places in Saluda County, South Carolina